Operation Magic Carpet is a widely known nickname for Operation On Wings of Eagles (Kanfei Nesharim), an operation between June 1949 and September 1950 that brought 49,000 Yemenite Jews to the new state of Israel. During its course, the overwhelming majority of Yemenite Jews – some 47,000 from Yemen, 1,500 from Aden, as well as 500 from Djibouti and Eritrea and some 2,000 Jews from Saudi Arabia – were airlifted to Israel. British and American transport planes made some 380 flights from Aden. At some point, the operation was also called Operation Messiah's Coming.

Background 
Various groups of Yemenite Jews have been immigrating to Palestine since 1881. In 1924 the ruler of (northern) Yemen, Imam Yahya, officially forbade Jewish immigration to Palestine, but in practice still allowed traveling through the British colony of Aden. By the start of World War II, there were some 28,000 Jews of Yemenite descent in Palestine. A group of roughly 5,000 was stuck in Aden since 1945 and was only allowed into Israel in 1948.

The operation 
The operation's official name originated from two biblical passages:
 Book of Exodus 19:4 – Ye have seen what I did unto the Egyptians, and how I bore you on eagles' wings, and brought you unto myself.
 Book of Isaiah 40:31 – But they that wait upon the LORD shall renew their strength; they shall mount up with wings as eagles; they shall run, and not be weary; and they shall walk, and not faint.

The Operation Magic Carpet was the first in a series of operations. Israel sees the rescue operation as a successful rescue of Yemen's community from oppression toward redemption. 49,000 Jews were brought to Israel under the program.

A street in Jerusalem, one in Herzliya, one in Ramat Gan, and another in Kerem HaTeimanim, Tel Aviv, were named "Kanfei Nesharim" ("Wings of Eagles") in honor of this operation.

In 1948, there were 55,000 Jews living in Yemen, and another 8,000 in the British Colony of Aden.

Anti-Jewish violence
Following the 1947 UN Partition Plan, Muslim rioters attacked the Jewish community in Aden and killed at least 82 Jews (1947 Aden riots) and destroyed a number of Jewish homes. Early in 1948, accusations of the murder of two Muslim Yemeni girls led to looting of Jewish property.

Reasons for the exodus 
Jewish Agency's emissary, Rabbi Yaakov Shraibom was sent in 1949 to Yemen and discovered that there were around 50,000 Jews living in Yemen, which was unknown at the time to Israel. He sent multiple letters to convey the community's strong religious and messianic desire to come to Israel. David Ben-Gurion was reluctant at first, but he came through eventually.

Esther Meir-Glitzenstein showed evidence how the community's sentiment for Aliyah played a part in the exodus, the extent of which surprised even the Jewish state and the agency in charge of the operation, who were not prepared for the mass of Jews who were fleeing Yemen. Once he realized that, Shraibom tried to prevent the coming crisis and urged the community to stay in Yemen, but the sentiment of the community for Aliyah was stronger and they came nonetheless.

Meir-Glitzenstein also claims that collusion between Israel and the Imam of Yemen who "profited hugely from confiscatory taxes levied on the Jewish community" led to a botched operation in which the Jewish community suffered terribly. Reuven Ahroni and Tudor Parfitt argue that economic motivations also had a role in the massive emigration of Yemeni Jews, which began prior to 1948.

Tudor Parfitt described the reasons for the exodus as multi-faceted, some aspects due to Zionism and others more historically based:

Critiques 
Esther Meir-Glitzenstein also criticized the execution of the operation. She especially criticized the American Jewish Joint Distribution Committee and Israel, which, according to her, abandoned thousands of Jews in the deserts on the border between North Yemen and Aden. Mismanagement or corruption by the imam of Yemen, the British authorities, and the Jewish Agency also played a role. Some 850 Yemenite Jews died en route to their departure points, and in the community which reached Israel, infant mortality rates were high, albeit lower than in Yemen. According to Ben-Gurion's diary, the Yemeni children in the Israeli ma'abarot or tent transit camps were dying like flies. Children were often separated from their parents for hygienic reasons, or taken away to hospitals for treatment, but often, parents only received notification, often by loudspeaker, they had died. According to some testimony, there was a suspicion that the state kidnapped healthy Yemeni children, for adoption, and then informed the parents they had died. As a result, some decades later, the Yemenite Children Affair exploded, in which it was rumoured that something of the order of 1,000 children had gone missing. However, in 2019, Yaacov Lozowick, the former Israel State Archivist, explained the cases of the missing Yemenite babies in an article in Tablet magazine. There was a very high death rate, and disturbed medical professionals, he said, autopsied some of the bodies to try to find out why. Traditionally, autopsies were forbidden under Jewish law, and so this was hidden from the parents. Lozowick wrote that the files contained no evidence of any kidnappings.

The Jewish community in Yemen after the operation 
In 1959, another 3,000 Jews from Aden fled to Israel, while many more left as refugees to the United States and the United Kingdom. The emigration of Yemeni Jews continued as a trickle, but stopped in 1962, when a civil war broke out in North Yemen, which put an abrupt halt to further emigration. In 2013, a total of some 250 Jews still lived in Yemen. The Jewish communities in Raydah were shocked by the killing of Moshe Ya'ish al-Nahari in 2008. His wife and nine children emigrated to Israel. Other members of the Jewish community received hate letters and threats by phone. Amnesty International wrote to the Yemeni government, urging the country to protect its Jewish citizens. The human rights organization stated that it is "deeply concerned for the safety of members of the Jewish community in northwestern Yemen following the killing of one member of the community and anonymous serious threats to others to leave Yemen or face death". During the Gaza War, the Jewish communities in Raydah were attacked several times.

It was forbidden for native-born Yemeni Jews who had left the country to re-enter, rendering communication with these communities difficult. Muslims were therefore hired as shelihim (emissaries) to locate the remaining Jews, pay their debts, and transport them to Aden. Little came of this.
In August 2020, of an estimated 100 or so remaining Yemen Jews, 42 have migrated to the United Arab Emirates (UAE) and the rest would also leave.

On November 10, 2020, the U.S. State Department called for the immediate and unconditional release of Levi Salem Musa Marhabi. A press statement said Marhabi has been wrongfully detained by the Houthi  militia for four years, despite a court ordering his release in September 2019.

In December 2020 an Israeli Rabbi visited the Yemenite Jews who escaped to the UAE.

On 28 March 2021, 13 Jews were forced by the Houthis to leave Yemen, leaving the last four elderly Jews in Yemen. According to one report there are six Jews left in Yemen: one woman; her brother; three others, and Levi Salem Marahbi (who had been imprisoned for helping smuggle a Torah scroll out of Yemen).
In March 2022 the United Nations reports there is just one Jew in Yemen.

See also 

Amka
Operation Yakhin
Yemenite Jews in Israel
Jewish Agency for Israel
Austerity in Israel
Ma'abarot
Yemenite Children Affair
Ringworm affair

References

External links 
 Photographs of Operation Magic Carpet from the JDC Archives

Aliyah operations
History of Djibouti
Jews and Judaism in Eritrea
Jews and Judaism in Yemen
1949 in Israel
1950 in Israel
Kingdom of Yemen
1950 in Asia
Non-combat military operations involving Israel
Jewish exodus from Arab and Muslim countries
Military air transport
Yemenite Jews